This is a list of notable reporters who worked for United Press International during their careers:

Carl W. Ackerman, 1913-1914 Albany, NY and Washington, D.C. bureau reporter, 1915-1917 Berlin Correspondent
 Howard Arenstein, 1978 Jerusalem bureau chief 1981 editor on UPI's foreign desk in New York and Washington.
 James Baar, editor in the UPI Washington Bureau
 Arnaud de Borchgrave,  1947 -1951 Brussels bureau chief,  1998 president of UPI, 2001 editor-at-large of UPI based in Washington DC 
 Joe Bob Briggs
 David Brinkley
 Don Canaan UPI Ohio 1996-1999
 Lucien Carr
 Pye Chamberlayne
 John Chambers, son of Whittaker Chambers (UPI Radio, 1960s)
 Audio recap of 87th Congress (1962)
 Audio recap on Presidential Election (1964)
 Funeral Services for Adlai Stevenson (1965)
 Civil Rights Movement in 1965 (1965)
 Preview 1966 (1966)
 "From the People" with Hubert Humphrey (text) (February 1968)
 Audio on LBJ's signing of Civil Rights Act of 1968 (11 April 1968)
 Text of eyewitness account of RFK assassination (1968)
 Marquis Childs
 Charles Collingwood
 Walter Cronkite, 1939-1950, covered World War II for UP.
 William Boyd Dickinson
 Bill Downs
 Marc S. Ellenbogen
 James M. Flinchum
 Sylvana Foa
 Oscar Fraley
 Thomas Friedman
 Joseph L. Galloway
 Carmen Gentile 
 Seymour Hersh
 John Hoerr
 Richard C. Hottelet
Stewart Kellerman
 Michael Keon, covered the Chinese Civil War in the late 1940s
 David Kirby
 Paul Ladewski
 Eli Lake
 Larry LeSueur
 Eric Lyman
 Eugene Lyons
 Carlos Mendo
 Webb Miller
 Randy Minkoff
 Joe W. Morgan, editor who covered the Alger Hiss trial, Joseph Stalin death, Sputnik launch, Yuri Gagarin spaceflight, Robert F. Kennedy Jr. assassination
 M. R. Akhtar Mukul
 Ron Nessen
 Richard S. Newcombe
 Dan Olmsted
 Bill Rosinski
 Milton Richman
 Eric Sevareid
 Steve Sailer
 Harrison Salisbury
 Mac Sebree
 Neil Sheehan
 William Shirer
 Howard K. Smith
 Merriman Smith
 Jeff Stein
 Barry Sussman
 Roger Tatarian
 Helen Thomas
 Morris DeHaven Tracy
 Martin Walker
 Kate Webb
 Steve Wilstein
 Lester Ziffren

References

UPI
UPI
UPI